MAWI is an acronym for the Measurement and Analysis on the WIDE Internet, or Measurement and Analysis of Wide-area Internet.

MAWI may also refer to:

 Mawi, stage name of Asmawi Ani (born 1981), Malaysian singer